Trevin Shonari Caesar (born 26 April 1989) is a Trinidad and Tobago international footballer who plays for Club Sando as a forward.

Club career
Caesar has played club football for Ma Pau, Caledonia AIA and North East Stars. In July 2014 he signed a one-year contract with the San Antonio Scorpions of the NASL.

After a season with United Soccer League side Austin Aztex in 2015, Caesar moved to USL's Orange County Blues on January 13, 2016. He spent the 2017 season with Sacramento Republic. He signed for Cambodian club Svay Rieng in March 2018.

Caesar joined SC Gjilani in August 2018. He played there until 1 February 2019, where it was announced, that he had left the club. He returned to Trinidad with Club Sando.

International career
He made his international debut for Trinidad and Tobago in 2013.

International goals
Scores and results list Trinidad and Tobago's goal tally first.

References

1989 births
Living people
Trinidad and Tobago footballers
Trinidad and Tobago international footballers
Association football forwards
Ma Pau Stars S.C. players
Morvant Caledonia United players
North East Stars F.C. players
Austin Aztex players
San Antonio Scorpions players
Orange County SC players
Sacramento Republic FC players
Preah Khan Reach Svay Rieng FC players
SC Gjilani players
TT Pro League players
North American Soccer League players
USL Championship players
Football Superleague of Kosovo players
Trinidad and Tobago expatriate footballers
Trinidad and Tobago expatriate sportspeople in the United States
Expatriate soccer players in the United States
Trinidad and Tobago expatriate sportspeople in Cambodia
Expatriate footballers in Cambodia
Trinidad and Tobago expatriate sportspeople in Kosovo
Expatriate footballers in Kosovo
Club Sando F.C. players